Greg Kadel is an American fashion photographer and filmmaker based in New York City.

Biography 
Kadel was born and raised in Pennsylvania. He moved to New York to study marine biology and fine art. It was only after graduation he realized his passion for photography and filmmaking. He now spends his time living between New York, Paris, and Los Angeles.

Career 
Kadel's images have appeared in publications including American Vogue, Vogue Italia, Vogue Nippon, Vogue UK, L'Uomo Vogue, French Vogue, Vogue Germany, Vogue China, Numéro, Numéro Homme, Visionaire, i-D, The Face, Another Magazine, King Kong Harper's Bazaar, Dansk, W Jewelry, British GQ, 10 Magazine, Allure, Inside View, V, and Melody.

His advertising clients include or have included Aveda, Express, Valentino, Louis Vuitton, H&M, Max Mara, Loewe, Oscar de la Renta, Calvin Klein, Biotherm, Diane von Fürstenberg, Elie Tahari, Hermès, Lancôme, L'Oréal, Max Mara, Shiseido, Victoria's Secret, and Salvatore Ferragamo.

Kadel’s celebrity clients include Britney Spears, Casey Affleck, Stella McCartney, Ioan Gruffudd, Claire Danes, Ben Chaplin, Maurizio Cattelan, Kiera Chaplin, Hedi Slimane, and Megan Fox.

Allegations
In a February 2018 story in the Boston Globe, two women accused Kadel of making unwanted advances. As a consequence of the allegations, Kadel lost contracts with Condé Nast'' and Victoria's Secret. Kadel has denied the allegations.

References

External links 
 
 
 Greg Kadel's Portfolio at Marek and Associates

American photographers
Living people
Year of birth missing (living people)
People from Pennsylvania
People from New York City
Photographers from New York City
Filmmakers from New York (state)